The Americas: A Quarterly Review of Latin American History is a quarterly peer-reviewed academic journal covering political, social, economic, intellectual, and religious history of the Americas. It is published on behalf of the Academy of American Franciscan History by Cambridge University Press and the editor-in-chief is Ben Vinson III (George Washington University). The Conference on Latin American History awards an annual prize named for the journal's long-time editor, Antonine Tibesar, for the best article published in the previous year.

The journal is a standard in the field of Latin American studies.

Abstracting and indexing
The journal is abstracted and indexed in:

According to the Journal Citation Reports, the journal has a 2016 impact factor of 0.229.

References

External links

Latin American studies journals
Quarterly journals
History of the Americas journals
Publications established in 1944
Cambridge University Press academic journals
English-language journals